The 1979–80 Iraqi National Clubs First Division was the 6th season of the competition since its foundation in 1974. Al-Shorta won their first Premier League title, qualifying them for the inaugural edition of the Arab Club Champions Cup which they went on to win.

The race for the title went to the last matchday; Al-Shorta beat Al-Minaa 3–1 in their last game on 2 May to go top of the league but Al-Zawraa would win the league if they managed to beat Al-Shabab two days later. Al-Zawraa drew their match 1–1, therefore Al-Shorta were crowned champions, winning the title on goal difference.

League table

Results

Season statistics

Top scorers

Hat-tricks

Notes
4 Player scored 4 goals

References

External links
 Iraq Football Association

Iraqi Premier League seasons
Iraq
1